Stixis is a genus of longhorn beetles of the subfamily Lamiinae,

Species
The genus contains the following species:
 Stixis grossepunctata Breuning, 1942
 Stixis itzingeri Breuning, 1936
 Stixis punctata Gahan, 1890
 Stixis usambarica Adlbauer, 2010

References

Phrissomini
Cerambycidae genera
Taxa named by Charles Joseph Gahan